"Arashi" (stylized as A・RA・SHI) is a song recorded by the Japanese boy band of the same name. It was released on November 3, 1999, by the record label Pony Canyon as the band's first single. "Arashi" was used as the theme song for Arashi's mini-drama  and for the 8th World Cup of Volleyball hosted by Japan in 1999, featuring the group as supporters. While both the regular and limited editions were released as a CD single containing two songs and its instrumentals, only the limited edition included a poster.

A new version of "Arashi", A-ra-shi: Reborn, was released on December 20, 2019, as a single in the start of the Reborn project. A-ra-shi: Reborn was later included in the Arashi Reborn Vol.1 extended play, released on February 28, 2020, together with A Day in Our Life: Reborn, and One Love: Reborn.

Single information
Perhaps the group's most popular song, "Arashi" is a crowd favorite during concerts. When it was released, an estimated 80,000 fans showed up to attend the single's debut event. In 2006, its chorus ("You are my soul! Soul!") was the name of the band's South Korea concert, You Are My Seoul, Soul.

The song's music video was included in their official YouTube channel, when it opened in 2019, and later on, also a live version. The song was also included in their official pages of streaming sites Apple Music, Spotify, and the such.

Track list

Chart performance
Selling over 557,000 in its first week and over 970,000 copies by the end of its chart run, the single is the group's best-selling single. The single was certified double platinum in Japan for a shipment of 800,000 copies.

Charts and certifications

Weekly charts

Year-end charts

Sales and certifications

Release history

References

External links
 "Arashi" Oricon profile
 "Arashi" Yahoo! Japan music profile
 "Arashi" Karao single ranking profile
 "Arashi" product information

Arashi songs
1999 debut singles
Oricon Weekly number-one singles
1999 songs
Pony Canyon singles